Strioturbonilla is a small genus of very small sea snails, marine gastropod molluscs or micromolluscs in the family Pyramidellidae, the pyrams and their allies, and the subfamily Chrysallidinae, a large taxon of minute marine gastropods with an intorted protoconch.

Species
 † Strioturbonilla flexicostata (Maxwell, 1992) 
 Strioturbonilla sigmoidea (Monterosato, 1880)

References

Pyramidellidae